Lost in America is Edwin McCain's seventh studio album, released on April 11, 2006.

Track listing
 "Gramercy Park Hotel"
 "The Kiss"
 "Welcome To Struggleville"  written by Bill Mallonee
 "Truly Believe"
 "Lost In America"
 "My Mystery"
 "Black And Blue"
 "Bitter And Twisted"
 "Losing Tonight"
 "Babylon"

Personnel
 Larry Chaney - acoustic guitar, electric guitar
 Dave Harrison - drums, percussion, background vocals
 Lee Hendricks - bass guitar
 Edwin McCain - acoustic guitar, lead vocals, background vocals
 Pete Riley - acoustic guitar, electric guitar, background vocals
 Craig Shields - accordion, Hammond organ, piano, saxophone, Wurlitzer
 Craig Wright - cajón, shaker, udu

References

2006 albums
Edwin McCain albums
Vanguard Records albums